Maryla may refer to:

 Maryla Jonas (1911–1959), Polish classical pianist
 Maryla Rodowicz, stage name of Polish singer and actress Maria Antonina Rodowicz (born 1945)
 Maryla Szymiczkowa, pen name of Polish poet, writer, translator and painter Jacek Maria Dehnel (born 1980) and his partner Piotr Tarczynski
 Maryla Wolska (1873–1930), Polish poet of the Young Poland movement
 Bartel BM 1 Maryla, a 1925 Polish military fighter design that was never built

Polish feminine given names